Karwowo may refer to the following places:
Karwowo, Gmina Radziłów in Podlaskie Voivodeship (north-east Poland)
Karwowo, Gmina Rajgród in Podlaskie Voivodeship (north-east Poland)
Karwowo, Kolno County in Podlaskie Voivodeship (north-east Poland)
Karwowo, Masovian Voivodeship (east-central Poland)
Karwowo, Łobez County in West Pomeranian Voivodeship (north-west Poland)
Karwowo, Police County in West Pomeranian Voivodeship (north-west Poland)